Synaphe fuscochralis is a species of moth of the family Pyralidae. It was described by Patrice J.A. Leraut in 2007. It is found in Namibia.

References

Endemic fauna of Namibia
Moths described in 2007
Pyralini
Insects of Namibia
Moths of Africa